The year 1851 was the 70th year of the Rattanakosin Kingdom of Siam (now known as Thailand). It was the 28th and last year in the reign of King Nangklao (Rama III), and the first year in the reign of King Mongkut (Rama IV).

Incumbents
 King: 
until 2 April: Nangklao (Rama III); starting 2 April: Mongkut (Rama IV)
 Front Palace: 
starting 25 May: Pinklao
 Supreme Patriarch:
starting 1 August: Paramanuchitchinorot

Events

January

February

March

April

May
May 15 - King Rama IV (Mongkut) is crowned, and takes as his wife Somanass Waddhanawathy. This is the first time foreigners have been invited to a coronation ceremony in Siam. The ceremony, which had previously been held according to Hindu rites, also incorporates the recitation of the Buddhist "Paritta Suttas". 
May 25 - Pinklao begins his tenure as Front Palace (vice-king) of Siam.

June

July

August

September

October

November

December

Ongoing
Burmese–Siamese War (1849–55)
France makes approaches to Siam, in an effort to establish trade relations.

Births

Deaths
April 2 - Rama III, 63, King of Siam
August 9 - Karl Gützlaff, 48, German missionary

References

External links

 
1850s in Siam
Years of the 19th century in Siam
Siam
Siam